The MTV2 Award was first presented at the MTV Video Music Awards in 2001. The category recognized the best videos to have premiered and/or got their start in MTV's sister channel, MTV2. Much like the Viewer's Choice award, the MTV2 Award was also fan-voted. Until 2005, the award was considered to be one of the main awards of the night, even being presented on the main show; in 2006, though, the MTV2 Award was relegated to being handed out during a commercial break of the MTV2 simulcast of the VMAs. The following year, as the VMAs were revamped, the MTV2 Award was eliminated and subsequently never brought back.

Recipients

MTV Video Music Awards
Awards established in 2001
Awards disestablished in 2006